Saranjeh-e Qolayi (also Romanized as Saranjeh-e Qolāyī; also known as Saranjeh, Sarenjeh, and Sarīnjeh) is a village in Qalayi Rural District, Firuzabad District, Selseleh County, Lorestan Province, Iran. At the 2006 census, its population was 161, in 34 families.

References 

Towns and villages in Selseleh County